Tenuinaclia is a genus of moth in the subfamily Arctiinae  from Madagascar.

Species
Tenuinaclia andapa	Griveaud, 1964
Tenuinaclia melancholica		(Le Cerf, 1921)
Tenuinaclia oberthueri		(Rothschild, 1911)

References
Griveaud 1964b. Lépidoptères Amatidae. - Faune de Madagascar 17:1–147.
Afromoths

Arctiinae